Dolna Day School is an English-medium co-ed school located at Rash Behari Avenue Connector, Kolkata, West Bengal, India. It is affiliated to the 
Council for the Indian School Certificate Examinations for the Indian Certificate of Secondary Education and Indian School Certificate examinations. The school was established by Madhusree Dasgupta in 1972.

Notable alumni
Parambrata Chatterjee, actor
Srijit Mukherji, filmmaker

See also
Education in India
List of schools in India
Education in West Bengal

References

External links 
 

Schools in Kolkata
Educational institutions established in 1972
1972 establishments in West Bengal